The individual show jumping at the 1980 Summer Olympics took place on 3 August at the Grand Arena of the Central Lenin Stadium. The event was open to men and women. This event was heavily impacted by the American-led boycott. There were 16 competitors from 7 nations. Previous Games had approximately 50 riders at each. The event was won by Jan Kowalczyk of Poland, the nation's first victory in individual jumping and first medal in the event since 1924. Nikolai Korolkov earned the Soviet Union's first medal in the event with his silver. Mexico reached the podium for the first time since 1948 with Joaquín Pérez's bronze.

Background

This was the 16th appearance of the event, which had first been held at the 1900 Summer Olympics and has been held at every Summer Olympics at which equestrian sports have been featured (that is, excluding 1896, 1904, and 1908). It is the oldest event on the current programme, the only one that was held in 1900. The team and individual events remained separated, as they had been starting in 1968.

The small field was devoid of top riders. Even among Western nations that competed at the Games, such as Belgium, France, Italy, and Great Britain, participation in this event was low, with many opting to compete at the Rotterdam Show Jumping Festival instead. None of the top 10 riders from the 1976 competition returned. No former Olympic medalists were present. No World Championships medalists competed.

Bulgaria made its debut in the event. Mexico competed for the 8th time, most of any nation competing but well behind the 14 appearances of France (missing the event for only the second time); eleven nations with more appearances than Mexico did not compete in 1980.

Competition format

The competition used the two-round format introduced in 1952. The elimination feature added in 1968 was not used due to the small field; in previous years, the top 20 riders advanced from the first round to the second but with only 16 starters in 1980 there was no elimination. Both rounds were combined to determine placement. If tied a jump-off between all tied riders would determine the winners.

Schedule

All times are Moscow Time (UTC+3)

Results

References

Equestrian at the 1980 Summer Olympics